Luis Antonio Nova Rocha (July 30, 1943 – April 9, 2013) was the Roman Catholic bishop of the Diocese of Facatativá, Colombia.

Ordained in 1968, Nova Rocha was named bishop in 2002 and died while still in office.

Notes

1943 births
2013 deaths
21st-century Roman Catholic bishops in Colombia
Roman Catholic bishops of Barranquilla
Roman Catholic bishops of Facatativá